This is an alphabetical list of baseball players from Panama who played in Major League Baseball between  and . The first Panamanian ever to appear in the Majors was Humberto Robinson.

Current
Darío Agrazal
Jonathan Arauz
Jaime Barría
Johan Camargo
Allen Córdoba
Justin Lawrence
Randall Delgado
Paolo Espino
Javy Guerra
Ariel Jurado
Rubén Tejada
Edmundo Sosa

Former

Ed Acosta
Manny Acosta
Manuel Barrios
Juan Berenguer
Christian Bethancourt
Enrique Burgos (born 1965)
Enrique Burgos (born 1990)
Rod Carew
Ossie Chavarria
Ángel Chávez
Bruce Chen
Webbo Clarke
Manny Corpas
Roger Deago
Luis Durango
Einar Díaz
Mike Eden
Gil Garrido
Severino González
Bill Haywood
Tom Hughes
Roberto Kelly
Carlos Lee
Allan Lewis
Héctor López
José Macías
Carlos Maldonado
Rafael Medina
Ramiro Mendoza
Orlando Miller
Omar Moreno
Julio Mosquera
Ivan Murrell
Sherman Obando
Ben Oglivie
Adolfo Phillips
Bobby Prescott
Fernando Ramsey
Mariano Rivera
Rubén Rivera
Dave Roberts
Humberto Robinson
Davis Romero
Carlos Ruiz
Olmedo Sáenz
Chico Salmon
Manny Sanguillén
Pat Scantlebury
Fernando Seguignol
Rennie Stennett
Ray Webster
Julio Zuleta

References

 
Panama
Baseball players from Panama in Major League Baseball